Philipp Müller (born 14 September 1984) is a German handball player for MT Melsungen and the German national team.

References

1984 births
Living people
German male handball players
Sportspeople from Bayreuth